David Henry Jacobs (30 April 1888 – 6 June 1976) was a Welsh-born track and field sprinter. He was the first British Jew to win an Olympic gold medal.

He was born in Cardiff, to John Jacobs (previously Yaakov), who was a general dealer from London. His athletics career started in London with Herne Hill Harriers in 1908. His interest in athletics was aroused by watching the 1908 Olympic Games.

At the 1912 Summer Olympics in Stockholm, Jacobs won a gold medal as the first leg in the British 4 × 100 m relay team, in spite of finishing second behind the United States in the semifinals. The United States was later disqualified for a fault in passing the baton, the same mistake made in the finals by the world record holder and main favourite German team.

Jacobs also competed in the 100m and 200m individual events, but was eliminated in the semifinals.

Although many times a Welsh champion, Jacobs never succeeded in winning an AAA title. He retired from active sport after World War I.

He died suddenly in Aberconwy, aged 88, while on holiday from his London home. His body was returned to London, where he was buried in a Jewish cemetery, at East Ham. At the time of his death he was Britain's oldest Olympic gold medalist.

See also
 Harold Abrahams, British Jewish sprint champion in 1924 Olympics
 Chariots of Fire, award-winning 1981 film depicting Abrahams' story

References

1888 births
1976 deaths
Sportspeople from Cardiff
Welsh male sprinters
Jewish male athletes (track and field)
Welsh Jews
Olympic athletes of Great Britain
Olympic gold medallists for Great Britain
Welsh Olympic medallists
Athletes (track and field) at the 1912 Summer Olympics
Medalists at the 1912 Summer Olympics
Olympic gold medalists in athletics (track and field)